Boys is a 1996 American film starring Winona Ryder and Lukas Haas. It is based very loosely on a short story called "Twenty Minutes" by James Salter.

The film is set in an East Coast boys boarding school, and was shot in Baltimore and on the campus of St. John's College in Annapolis, Maryland.

Plot
John Baker Jr. (Lukas Haas) is a boy bored with his life at an upper middle class boarding school, and the prospect of his future running the family grocery store chain. He no longer sees the point in school, stating what's the difference if he gets a zero attendance for being three minutes late or skipping the whole class so he might as well skip the class. Now close to graduating from boarding school, his life is turned upside down when he rescues Patty Vare (Winona Ryder), a young woman he finds lying unconscious in a field.  Patty regains consciousness that evening in John's dormitory.  She stays awake long enough to tell him she will not go to a doctor, and then passes out and does not awaken until the next morning. She seems to recover completely and to be grateful for John's assistance; the two begin a romantic voyage of self-discovery. This is not without its problems, as other boys in the dorm quickly find out she is being hidden in his room, leading up to a dramatic confrontation with Baker's close friends where his 'best friend' becomes enraged and punches a wall, breaking his hand, while the two continue to argue over the reason as to why Baker has hidden her in his room.

Throughout the film, there are continuous flashbacks of Vare's past, showing her with a famous baseball player with whom she steals a car, leading up to a drunken car crash and his death (for which authorities are searching for Vare for questioning). By the end, Vare has admitted all this to Baker and informed the authorities of the location of the body and the car (as they crashed into a river). At the police station, both Baker and Vare begin to say goodbye when they unexpectedly jump into an elevator to escape from Baker's controlling father (Chris Cooper), and drive off with a car he had earlier stolen from the school.

Cast

Reception
After "a dispute with her studio led to an extensive involuntary editing process," director Cochran commented that "much of the original intent and beauty of the film had been lost, due to studio interference."

The film received negative reviews from critics. Terrence Rafferty of The New Yorker wrote, "Boys, subjected to self-fulfilling negative buzz, has received lukewarm-to-terrible reviews and has done no business. It deserves better. [...] Cochran is too eccentric to make a conventional comedy, yet unfortunately (in marketing terms), her style is too subtle and uninsistent to place her among the aggressively hip, genre-bending filmmakers of the Tarantino generation. The funny thing is, this young filmmaker may have a more deeply subversive sensibility than any of her celebrated peers." Boys holds a rating of 15% on Rotten Tomatoes from 27 reviews.

Official soundtrack
The soundtrack to the film was released on April 9, 1996.
 "She's Not There" - Cruel Sea
 "Alright" - Cast
 "Gotta Know Right Now" - Smoking Popes
 "Honeysimple" - Scarce
 "Wildwood" (Sheared Wood Mix) - Paul Weller, remixed by Portishead
 "Colored Water" - Orbit	
 "Sad & Beautiful World" - Sparklehorse
 "Fading Fast" - Kelly Willis 	
 "Tell Her This" - Del Amitri
 "If I Didn't Love You" - Squeeze 	
 "Inside" - Slider
 "Wait for the Sun" - Supergrass	
 "Belly Laugh" - Compulsion
 "Begging You" - The Stone Roses
 "Evade Chums" - Stewart Copeland

References

External links
 
 
 

1996 films
1990s teen drama films
American romantic drama films
American teen drama films
1990s Spanish-language films
Films directed by Stacy Cochran
Films shot in Baltimore
Touchstone Pictures films
Interscope Communications films
PolyGram Filmed Entertainment films
Films produced by Peter Frankfurt
Films scored by Stewart Copeland
1996 drama films
Films based on short fiction
1990s English-language films
1990s American films